The Swedish Society for Nature Conservation (previously known as , SNF) is a non-profit, non-partisan, Swedish environmental organization. It is the largest and oldest environmental society in Sweden, with 24 county branches and 270 municipality subdivisions. In 2019, it had 230,000 members.

History 
The society was formed in 1909, by a number of professors and academics interested in natural history and environmental issues. One of the founders was botanist Rutger Sernander, who had a prominent position in the society until his death in 1944. Writer Sten Selander was chairman of the society for many years. Mikael Karlsson was chairman in 2002–2014, succeeded by Johanna Sandahl who had been vice chairman.

During the first decades, the society mainly worked with protecting selected natural sites and endangered species. It also published a journal, Sveriges natur ("Swedish nature"). As new environmental problems developed, the work of the society has changed. The organization was instrumental in establishing large parts of modern environmental legislation in Sweden, as well as forming government agencies like the Environmental Protection Agency.

Function 

The Society for Nature Conservation works strengthening public awareness for environmental issues, experiencing nature and love for nature, as well as influencing political decisions and interact with other international organizations. The society cooperates with other environmental organizations within the European Union and it is also twinning with organizations in the Far East, Africa and South America with support from the Swedish International Development Cooperation Agency (Sida).

The organization manages the Alvin Fund jointly with the Environmental Protection Agency and the Swedish Ornithological Society. The fund contributes to projects involved in nature protection, primarily bird protection.

A significant part of the society's work is to, through consumers, influence manufacturers and commerce to take a more active responsibility for the environment. The organization initiated the annual Miljövänliga veckan ("Eco-friendly Week") in 1990, and the ecolabels Bra Miljöval ("Good Eco-choice") and Naturens Bästa ("Nature's Best").

Symbol 
The symbol for the Society for Nature Conservation is a peregrine falcon, one of the species strongly affected by pollution. The society has helped save the peregrine in Sweden by contributing to breeding programs and surveillance of nests and habitats.

Sveriges Natur
Sveriges Natur (Sweden's Nature) has been the Swedish Society for Nature Conservations member magazine since 1910, Erik Halkjær is the magazine's editor-in-chief and publisher. Sweden's Nature has been awarded the Guldspaden from the Swedish Association of Investigative Journalism  2017 and 2018.

Fältbiologerna 

The Nature and Youth Sweden (Fältbiologerna lit. Field Biologists) is an independent youth organization formed in 1947 for youth interested in nature studies and environmental protection, under the aegis of the Society for Nature Conservation. The Field Biologists have a mixed range of activities, ranging from birdwatching and lichen classes to environmental campaigns, climate and fairness actions, and forest inventory. A significant aspect of the organization is that the members themselves select and organize the activities.

Notes

References 

Nature conservation organisations based in Europe
Organizations established in 1909
Environmental organizations based in Sweden
Clubs and societies in Sweden
1909 establishments in Sweden